Qaratəpə is a village and municipality in the Barda Rayon of Azerbaijan. It has a population of 551.

References

Populated places in Barda District